The 2000 Spring Stampede was the fifth and final Spring Stampede pay-per-view (PPV) event produced by World Championship Wrestling (WCW). The event took place on April 16, 2000 from the United Center in Chicago.

The event was notable due to the creation of a new WCW after Eric Bischoff and Vince Russo rebooted the company by vacating all the championships and refreshing the WCW roster. Many tournaments occurred during the event for the vacated championships. The main event was the tournament final for the vacated WCW World Heavyweight Championship between Diamond Dallas Page and Jeff Jarrett. During the match, Page's wife Kimberly Page turned on her husband, allowing Jarrett to win the title.

The undercard featured tournaments to crown the new World Tag Team and United States Heavyweight Champions. Shane Douglas and Buff Bagwell defeated Ric Flair and The Total Package to win the vacated World Tag Team Championship and Scott Steiner defeated Sting to win the vacated United States Heavyweight Championship. Chris Candido won a Six-Way match for the vacant Cruiserweight Championship and Terry Funk defeated Norman Smiley in a Hardcore match for the vacant Hardcore Championship.

The events of this event would lead to the beginning of an angle, in which the WCW roster was divided into two factions: New Blood and Millionaire's Club. New Blood was the villainous group of young wrestlers and Millionaire's Club was the heroic group of veterans of the industry.

Storylines
The event featured wrestlers from pre-existing scripted feuds and storylines. Wrestlers portrayed villains, heroes, or less distinguishable characters in the scripted events that built tension and culminated in a wrestling match or series of matches.

Reception
In 2015, Kevin Pantoja of 411Mania gave the event a rating of 3.5 [Bad], stating, "Surprisingly, this is the highest score I’ve given WCW in 2000. Nothing on this show is must see at all, but I managed to see a near three star effort. With the exception of the Mancow/Hart match, everything is at the very least watchable. The fact that there are fourteen matches means that things move by rather quickly, which helps. There was potential here, but everything is so overdone by shenanigans that [it] ends up ruining it."

Results

Tournament brackets

World Heavyweight Championship Tournament

World Tag Team Championship Tournament

United States Heavyweight Championship Tournament

References

External links
Spring Stampede 2000 results

Spring Stampede
2000 in Illinois
2000s in Chicago
Events in Chicago
Professional wrestling in the Chicago metropolitan area
2000 World Championship Wrestling pay-per-view events
April 2000 events in the United States